Mansfield Plantation is a well-preserved antebellum rice plantation, established in 1718 on the banks of the Black River in historic Georgetown County, South Carolina.

History
Mansfield, along with adjacent rice plantations up and down the Black River, provided much of Europe with "Carolina Gold" rice during the late 18th and early 19th centuries.  
Rice growing was made possible by:
 perfecting irrigation techniques using tidal water and manmade dykes.
 experimentation with natural fertilizers.
 most notably, African-American slave labor.

After the American Civil War, rice production became too expensive and soon the plantations fell into bankruptcy and were sold off to new owners.

Present day
Today, Mansfield Plantation is preserved as an authentic rice plantation, complete with the original plantation home, a school house, live oak avenue ("oak allée"), chapel, guest house, and grounds. It also has the only remaining winnowing barn in Georgetown County, where rice grains were processed for shipment.

Restoration
Undergoing restoration is a slave village of 7 slave cabins and a chapel.

In 2009, the entire plantation underwent a privately funded, massive restoration project to keep its distinct history alive for generations to come.  It is said to be the only American plantation saved from development and reclaimed by a direct descendant of the original owners.

Media
Mansfield Plantation has been featured in numerous films, documentaries and television shows.  It served as the backdrop for scenes from Mel Gibson's 2000 film, The Patriot. In 2006, the Fox network filmed two segments of their primetime television series Treasure Hunters at Mansfield and the Fine Living Network filmed a documentary at Mansfield Plantation for their television series Windshield America.

See also
National Register of Historic Places listings in Georgetown County, South Carolina
Plantations in South Carolina

Gallery

References

External links 

Mansfieldplantation.com: Official Mansfield Plantation website
Mansfieldplantation.com: Interactive plantation map
Mansfield Plantation Photos & History
NPS.org: When Rice Was King —  a National Park Service Teaching with Historic Places (TwHP) lesson plan.

Plantations in South Carolina
Houses in Georgetown County, South Carolina
Houses on the National Register of Historic Places in South Carolina
National Register of Historic Places in Georgetown County, South Carolina
History of the Southern United States
Pre-statehood history of South Carolina
Rice production in the United States
Historic American Buildings Survey in South Carolina
Bed and breakfasts in South Carolina
Slave cabins and quarters in the United States
1718 establishments in South Carolina